East Preston & Ferring is an electoral division of West Sussex in the United Kingdom and returns one member to sit on West Sussex County Council. The current County Councillor, Peter Evans, is also Cabinet Member for Public Protection.

Extent
The division covers the villages of East Preston, Ferring and Kingston Gorse.

It comprises the following Arun District wards: East Preston with Kingston Ward, and Ferring Ward; and of the following civil parishes: East Preston, Ferring and Kingston.

Election results

2013 Election
Results of the election held on 2 May 2013:

2009 Election
The latest election took place on 4 June 2009:

2005 Election
Results of the election held on 5 May 2005:

References
Election Results - West Sussex County Council

External links
 West Sussex County Council
 Election Maps

Electoral Divisions of West Sussex